Sandstone Township may refer to the following places in the United States:

 Sandstone Township, Jackson County, Michigan
 Sandstone Township, Pine County, Minnesota

Township name disambiguation pages